A Scorpion Bowl is a communally shared alcoholic tiki drink served in a large ceramic bowl traditionally decorated with wahine or hula-girl island scenes and meant to be drunk through long straws. Bowl shapes and decorations can vary considerably. Starting off as a single-serve drink known as the Scorpion cocktail, its immense popularity as a bowl drink in tiki culture is attributed to Trader Vic. 

The drink  contains light rum, brandy, and orgeat syrup along with orange and lemon juice and is typically heavily garnished. The ceramic vessel itself is also referred to as a "scorpion bowl".

Different versions can have multiple types of rum (overproof, dark and white), gin, wine, and fruit juices. If a sparkling wine "floater" is being added this should be done last after the other ingredients have been mixed.

Trader Vic Scorpions
Trader Vic is largely credited with inventing the Scorpion Bowl, which after the Mai Tai and the Fog Cutter was Vic's third most famous cocktail.  As called for in his Bartender's Guide from 1947, his Scorpion Punch was meant for twelve people with listed ingredients of: 1 1/2 bottles of Puerto Rican rum, 2 oz gin, 2 oz brandy, 1 pt fresh lemon juice, 1/2 pt fresh orange juice, 1/2 pt orgeat syrup, 1/2 bottle of white wine, and 2 sprigs of fresh mint.

In his revised 1972 edition he had dropped the use of gin and wine for his non-punch versions. The individual Scorpion cocktail called for 2 oz of light Puerto Rican rum, 1 oz brandy, 2 oz orange juice, 1 1/2 oz lemon juice, and 1/2 oz orgeat syrup.  It was blended with shaved ice in an electric mixer and poured into a "grapefruit supreme" glass. Some ice cubes were added and then garnished with a gardenia. As pictured in his book the grapefruit supreme glass was clear in color and shaped like a grapefruit cut in half, resembling a small bowl if placed on a glass stem.  It was sometimes referred to as an "individual scorpion bowl", but was still this described glass and not a miniature ceramic bowl. The first tiki drink named the Scorpion is believed by some to have been tried by Vic in 1930's Hawaii, and used a local moonshine made there called Okolehao. An alleged quote by Bergeron (aka, Trader Vic) from this time has him saying "I’ll never forget a very beautiful form of gentle anesthesia served one night at a luau up in Manoa Valley in Honolulu. The object of greatest interest was a tremendous Chinese earthen crock which easily held twenty gallons of punch. In it our host had prepared Honolulu’s famous Scorpion, a drink which does not shilly shally or mess around in getting you under way".

Vic's recipe when being made for groups in ceramic scorpion bowls sees the cocktail-for-one recipe increase some ingredients but not others, meaning the individual cocktail will be a slightly different drink than the bowl version due to changing proportions.  For example, in a bowl the quantity of rum is increased to 6 oz, but the brandy remains at 1 oz.

Other Trader Vic's bowl drinks 
Vic's 1947 Bartender's Guide index specifically refers to an illustration for the exact container the drink should be served in, which was designated for use with both the Scorpion Bowl drink and the Gremlin drink. The also illustrated and slightly different Kava Bowl was shown as drawn to be narrower and taller, but no specific drink recipe was listed for it. As described on a 1968 Trader Vic's menu, the Kava Bowl was for four persons with "Light And Aromatic Rums, Fruit Juices, Grenadine And Liqueurs, Served In A Communal Bowl With 20 Inch Straws". The Scorpion Bowl as "A Festive Concoction Of Rums, Fruit Juices And Brandy, With A Whisper Of Almond, Bedecked With Gardenias And Served With Long Straws". A third bowl drink from the same menu, the Tiki Bowl, was "A Delightful Punch Served In Earthen Bowl Supported By Three Tikis Replicas Of Authentic Tahitian Gods". The menu listed other communal punch drinks not served in bowls, such as the Rum Keg (for four persons): "A Delightful Barrel Full Of Rums, Liqueurs, And Fresh Fruit Juices".

The Kava Bowl was more fully described in Vic's 1972 revised edition. It was similar to the Scorpion Bowl but called for a more expensive rum in lieu of the brandy and substituted the orange juice for unsweetened pineapple juice and grenadine. The previous reference to a physical "kava bowl" was also missing, and the instructions for the Kava Bowl called for using a scorpion bowl.

Later variations 
Separate small ceramic volcanic crater dishes were sometimes later placed inside the center of Scorpion Bowls, turning them into "volcano bowls". This was later discontinued as specific bowls began being made that had the volcano shape incorporated into the base scorpion bowl design.  For this reason the Scorpion Bowl cocktail is sometimes presented in a large 48-ounce volcano bowl but may still be called either a Scorpion Bowl or a Volcano Bowl. When served with dry ice, an orchid, and some 151 proof alcohol aflame in the volcanic center, the drink gives the appearance of a mysterious tropical island. Ceramic bowls supported by three tiki-shaped pedestals were originally called tiki bowls but they too started to be interchangeably called Scorpion Bowls and the importance of using the correct bowl fell by the wayside, with virtually any communal tiki cocktail served in bowl sometimes being referred to as a Scorpion Bowl.

Volcano versions were also rebranded as "The Mystery Drink" at tiki bars such as the Kahiki and the Mai Kai,  with ingredients very similar to a Scorpion Bowl.  Variations such as these proliferated and were on the menu in some manner at virtually all subsequent tiki bars. The Luau Scorpion for two people called for 2 oz gold Puerto Rican rum, 2 oz gin, 1 oz Cognac, 2 oz orange juice, 1 oz lime juice, 1 oz sugar syrup, and 3/4 oz orgeat syrup.

In popular culture 
As a teenager Candice Bergen drank Scorpion cocktails at The Luau restaurant in Beverly Hills, which was known for allowing underage drinking. She said that "it was such a strong drink...I couldn’t figure out how to get out of my chair at the end of the meal". Joseph Marshall, a college student back in 2001 still holds the record for drinking a scorpion bowl by himself in just under 11 seconds.

References 

Tiki drinks
Cocktails with rum